Kalama High School is a public high school located in Kalama, Washington. It is part of the Kalama School District. The school serves grades 9-12 and is on the same campus as Kalama Middle School (which serves grades 6–8) and the district office. As of the 2021–2022 school year, Kalama High School's enrollment was approximately 345 students, and the school had a 91% four-year graduation rate. The enrollment at Kalama Middle School was 266.

Voter-approved bond dollars and state grant funds awarded to Kalama School District allowed the middle and high school to receive facility upgrades in 2020 and 2021. The third floor of Kalama High School was transformed into science labs and a STEM classroom in August 2020. In the fall of 2021, a new, 33,000-square-foot secondary building opened to students featuring six classrooms, two learning commons, two science labs, two science prep rooms, a maker-space, library, media center, cafeteria and more.

Location
Kalama High School and Kalama Middle School sit at the top of a hill to the east of downtown Kalama. The hill has been nicknamed "High School Hill." The school was used as the High School in the original Twilight movie.

Athletics & extracurricular activities
Middle and high school students in Kalama have the opportunity to take part in a variety of extracurricular activities. For example, high school students are able to participate in drama club and Future Farmers of America (FFA). High school athletics include: Boys Basketball, Girls Basketball, Girls Volleyball, Cross Country, Wrestling, Football, Girls Soccer, Boys Baseball,  Girls Fastpitch Softball, Varsity Cheerleading and Track and Field.

State champions
 Basketball: 1949, 1950
 Football: 1952, 1998, 2017, 2018, 2021
 Soccer: 2021
 Softball: 1996, 2000
 Volleyball: 2016

State runners-up
 Baseball: 1994, 2006, 2008, 2009
 Basketball: 1948, 1951, 1977
 Football: 1999, 2019, 
 Softball: 1998
 Volleyball: 1995, 1998

Demographics (district-wide)
As of the 2021–2022 school year, Kalama School District contained 51.8% male students and 48.2% female students. Student ethnicity: 82.6% Caucasian, 11.9% Hispanic/Latino, 1.5% two or more races, 1.3% African American, 1.2% Native American/Alaskan Native, 1% Asian, 0.5% Native Hawaiian/Pacific Islander.

References

External links
Kalama School District official site
Kalama High School official site
Kalama Middle School official site
Washington State OSPI Report Card 2012-13

High schools in Cowlitz County, Washington
Public middle schools in Washington (state)
Public high schools in Washington (state)